Protease VII may refer to:
Omptin
Caspase 1